Neuroepidemiology is a bimonthly peer-reviewed medical journal covering the epidemiology of neurological conditions. It was established in 1982 with Bruce Schoenberg as the founding editor-in-chief, and is published by Karger Publishers. The current Editor-in-Chief is Valery Feigin (AUT). It is the official journal of the International Association of Neurology and Epidemiology. According to the Journal Citation Reports, the journal has a 2014 impact factor of 2.558.

References

External links

Neurology journals
Karger academic journals
Epidemiology journals
Publications established in 1982
Bimonthly journals
Academic journals associated with learned and professional societies
English-language journals